Scotland Yard is a board game in which a team of players controlling different detectives cooperate to track down a player controlling a criminal as they move around a board representing the streets of London. It was first published in 1983. It is named after Scotland Yard which is the headquarters of London's Metropolitan Police Service in real-life. Scotland Yard is an asymmetric board game, during which the detective players cooperatively solve a variant of the pursuit–evasion problem. The game is published by Ravensburger in most of Europe and Canada and by Milton Bradley in the United States. It received the Spiel des Jahres (Game of the Year) award in 1983-the same year that it was published.

Gameplay
One player controls 'Mr. X': a criminal whose location is only revealed periodically throughout gameplay. The other players each control a detective, all of which are always present on the board.

All players start with a number of tokens ("tickets") which each allow them to use one of the following methods of transport:
 Taxis, which allow the player to move only one space per use but can be used on most spaces in the game to move in all directions.
 Buses, which are available throughout most of the board and allow longer-distance travel but only if the player is located at a bus station.
 The Underground, which allows quick, long-distance travel between stations that are long distances from each other and can therefore be used to move towards Mr. X if he turns out to be a long distance away.
 Ferries, which only Mr. X can use with a black tile, allow him to follow routes along the River Thames between Greenwich and Whitehall.

All players draw one of 29 possible cards, each with a starting location on the back, which the player must move their token to. Mr. X always draws first and doesn't share where he is starting with the detectives. The locations on the cards are spaced far enough apart to ensure that Mr. X cannot be caught in the first round of play. There are a total of 199 spaces ("stations") on the board.

Each detective begins with a total of 22 transport tickets: 10 taxi tickets, 8 bus tickets and 4 Underground tickets. Once each transport token is used by a detective, it is turned over to Mr. X, effectively giving him an unlimited amount of transport tokens. For each move that Mr. X makes, he writes down his destination. The game comes with a "travel log" and paper inserts to be used with it, on which Mr. X can write this. After making a note of his location, Mr. X covers it with the ticket that he has used to move there, giving the detectives a clue as to his whereabouts.

Mr. X also has a supply of black tokens (one per detective in play or always five in the Milton Bradley version) that can be used in place of any other kind of transport ticket but prevents the type of transport from being visible, and three tokens that allow him to make two moves in a single round. The water routes require a black ticket to use and so when one of these is played the detectives must consider whether or not it is being used to hide a river trip.  Mr. X moves first each turn, after which the detectives must move, but they can do so in any order.

At five specific times during the game, Mr. X has to reveal his current position.  Detectives will take this opportunity to refine their search and, if possible, plan ways to encircle him. After Mr. X has revealed himself, the types of transport that he uses on the next few turns limit the number of possible spaces that Mr. X could be on, providing useful information to the detectives (as well as preventing some types of cheating from the person playing Mr. X).

The game is won by the detectives if any of them land on Mr. X's current location or if they block all of Mr. X's possible moves. Mr. X wins by avoiding capture until all detectives can no longer move, due to them either exhausting their token supplies or finding themselves at a station which they can't move from as they have no more usable tokens.

Although the game is designed for 3-6 players, many play this game with only 2. The detectives, when controlled by 1 person, are far more coordinated. When 3-5 people are playing as the detectives, they must work as a team which can be much more difficult, although they can share ideas and plans, allowing them to combine their brainpower.

The game contains:
1 game board (a map of Central London)
6 colored playing pieces
130 transportation tickets
1 label sheet
29 start cards
3 'double-move' tickets
1 travel log and paper inserts
1 storage tray to be used to store tickets, start cards and playing pieces

There are two mainboard editions, one typically associated with Milton Bradley, and another typically associated with Ravensburger. The primary difference between these is in the numbering of the stations: five stations are numbered differently, with 108 missing from the Milton Bradley boards and 200 missing from the Ravensburger boards. There are also minor differences in the routes, such as a bus line between stations 198 and 199 that is changed to a taxi line in later editions, and the removal of a taxi line between stations 13 and 14 sometime after the renumbering.

Alternative versions
The game has been adapted to take place on maps of different cities. Scotland Yard Tokyo, also distributed by Ravensburger is set on the streets of Tokyo; the major difference is game aesthetics. Scotland Yard: Swiss Edition uses the same gameplay and is set in Switzerland, with the addition of more boat routes and ski areas available only to Mr. X.

NY Chase is a version based on New York City. In this version, detectives do not hand their used tokens over, and they have access to roadblocks and a helicopter, tilting the game more in favour of those playing as detectives.

A faster travel version called Die Jagd Nach Mister X exists that functions quite differently. In this version, Mr. X's location is only hidden when a black travel token is used, and the game is essentially an open chase around London. Evasion is accomplished with black tokens and using the fastest travel to distant locations. In this version, each player takes turns as Mr. X, and points collected (in the form of the detectives' used travel tokens) determine the overall winner.

Alternative rules 
In 1986 Alain Munoz and Serge Laget posted an article in the French magazine Jeux & Stratégie suggesting alternative rules to balance and expand the game.

Spanish company Cefa published Alerta Roja (Red Alert) in 1986, which is generally a remake of Scotland Yard with minor variations to the rules and a different theme (secret agents chase a nuclear terrorist though the sewers of a futuristic city).

Adaptations
The game was first adapted for the Nintendo Game Boy in 1990, and then as Scotland Yard Interactive for the Philips CD-I in 1993. It was adapted for Windows by Cryo Interactive in 1998, for the Nintendo DS by Sproing Interactive in 2008, as well as for iPhone (2012) and Android (2015) by Ravensburger Digital.

Reception
Games included Scotland Yard in its top 100 games of 1986, calling it "a suspenseful chase through the streets of London in this game of deduction and bluff." The reviewer noted "Trapping Mr. X requires logic and teamwork; eluding the detectives takes sneakiness and an occasional risky move by Mr. X." A review from Lautapeliopas praised the game's accessibility and functionality, but said the playing as detectives is less engaging.

Reviews
Jeux & Stratégie #21

References

External links
 
 
 

Board games introduced in 1983
Murder and mystery board games
Spiel des Jahres winners
Cooperative board games
Deduction board games
Milton Bradley Company games
Ravensburger games
Pursuit–evasion